Underland: A Deep Time Journey is a book by Robert Macfarlane and the sequel to The Old Ways: A Journey on Foot. Initially published in English on 2 May 2019 by Hamish Hamilton in the UK and on 4 June 2019 by W. W. Norton & Company in the US, the book has been translated into over a dozen languages. An audiobook, read by Matthew Waterson, was also released in June 2019 by HighBridge Audio.

The book has received many awards and honours. It was a Sunday Times, New York Times, and Los Angeles Times Bestseller, it is a 2020 American Library Association Notable Book, and has won The 2019 National Outdoor Book Award for Natural History Literature, The 2019 Wainwright Prize for UK Nature Writing, and was named the 2020 Stanford Dolman Travel Book of the Year at the Edward Stanford Travel Writing Awards. The book has been placed on many lists for best books of 2019 and was named as number 56 of the "100 best books of the 21st century" by The Guardian in September 2019. The book was also named the second best reviewed book of the year by the review aggregator Book Marks, having collected 35 total reviews by December 2019 with 26 marked as "rave", seven as "positive", and two as "mixed".

Background 
The cover art is by Stanley Donwood, who adapted it from his 2013 painting "Nether". Prior to the book's publication, Macfarlane wrote that he had first seen the painting about a year after he began working on the book and it served as a muse over the next five years it would take him to finish: "I set my course by it, steered towards it."

Reception 
The book has received many reviews and has been praised by several celebrities.

Praise 
Richard Powers wrote that the book "is profound in every sense of the word" and that it had "changed the way that I think about the deep, hidden roots of our life on this planet." John Banville wrote that Macfarlane "is a superb naturalist, who seems to have been everywhere and noticed everything" and that his "style is a kind of muscular prose-poetry that manages somehow to be at once impressionistic and precise." Banville continued by writing: "The book abounds in amazing facts, breathtaking surprises, delightful anecdotes." Simon Reynolds wrote that the book "is a lexical delight in its own right, a feast of terms for underground spaces" and continued: "In all his writing, but particularly strongly here, Nature provides for Macfarlane and his readers a form of religion for the godless, stirring sensations of awe, gratitude, and humbling insignificance." Reynolds wrote that, while it isn't "flawless", the book makes for "an exhilarating read".

Reviews 
According to the review aggregator Book Marks, the book has received critical acclaim. Having collected 35 total reviews by publication, with 26 marked as "rave", seven as "positive", and two as "mixed", Book Marks named the book the second best reviewed book of the year in December 2019.

Among literary publications, review by Terry Tempest Williams made the front page of The New York Times Book Review in June 2019 and the book received starred reviews from Publishers Weekly, Kirkus Reviews, The Library Journal, and Booklist. Other reviewers include Colin Thubron in The New York Review of Books and Jonathan Meades in Literary Review, who called the book "a moral hymn to the strangeness of existence and a sharp warning not to take anything for granted." 

The book has also been reviewed in The Times Literary Supplement, The Australian Book Review, the American Book Review, The Sydney Review of Books, and The Chicago Review of Books.

In her review, Terry Tempest Williams wrote that "Macfarlane’s writing is muscular, meticulously researched and lyrical and closed by stating: "Underland is a portal of light in dark times. I needed this book of beauty below to balance the pain we’re witnessing aboveground." Colin Thubron called the book "remarkable" and a "masterpiece" and wrote: "The visionary perspectives that he evokes, earned from his own hard journeys, create a fusion of exhilaration, foreboding, and enchantment." Jonathan Meades wrote that "Macfarlane is a poet with the instincts of a thriller writer" and that the book "is a moral hymn to the strangeness of existence and a sharp warning not to take anything for granted."

Among academic publications, the book was reviewed by Huw Lewis-Jones in Nature,
as well as Fred Pearce in The New Scientist, while reviews were published in Science Magazine, National Geographic, Physics World, and Geographical Magazine.

Among trade publications and magazines, Nick Papadimitriou reviewed the book for The Financial Times, Prerna Singh Bindra reviewed the book for the Indian environmental magazine Open, Hugh Thomson reviewed the book for Prospect Magazine, Adam Nicolson reviewed the book for The Spectator, and Erica Wagner reviewed the book for New Statesman.

Among others, the book has been reviewed by Alex Preston, Seán Hewitt, Dwight Garner, Barbara J. King, William Dalrymple, Jedediah Purdy, John Carey, David Aaronovitch, Hannah Beckerman, Gregory Day, and Stuart Kelly.

Audiobook 
The audiobook edition, released on 4 June 2019 by HighBridge Audio, is narrated by Matthew Waterson. In a review for The Times, Christina Hardyment wrote that Waterson's "soft-voiced but always excitingly engaged commentary" complements the "increasingly poetic tendency" of Macfarlane's prose. Hardyment noted that the audiobook is "not a substitute for reading, but an add-on, a way of ensuring that you experience as quickly as possible Macfarlane’s labyrinthine journey through our honeycombed planet." The Times named the book "Audiobook of the Week". A review by AudioFile Magazine praised Waterson's "even pacing and soft British accent" with "a voice attuned to the author's lyricism and wit" as an "ideal guide".

Awards and honours 
The book has received many awards and honours, including being named a 2020 American Library Association Notable Book and winning The 2019 National Outdoor Book Award for Natural History Literature, The 2019 Wainwright Prize for UK Nature Writing, and the 2020 Stanford Dolman Travel Book of the Year, given at the Edward Stanford Travel Writing Awards. The book has been placed on many lists for best books of 2019 and was named as number 56 of the "100 best books of the 21st century" by The Guardian in September 2019.

Awards and nominations 
The book has received many awards and honours, including winning The 2019 National Outdoor Book Award for Natural History Literature, The 2019 Wainwright Prize for UK Nature Writing, and the 2020 Stanford Dolman Travel Book of the Year, given annually at the Edward Stanford Travel Writing Awards. It made shortlists for the 2019 Physics World Book of the Year Award and the 2020 Ondaatje Prize, it made longlists for the 2020 Orwell Prize for Political Writing and the 2020 Andrew Carnegie Medals for Excellence in Nonfiction, and was nominated for the 2019 Goodreads Choice Award for Science & Technology.

Best book lists 
Among other honours, the book was named a 2020 American Library Association Notable Book, it has been placed on many lists for best books of 2019, it was named as number 56 of the "100 best books of the 21st century" by The Guardian in September 2019, and it was placed on a list of "The 20 Best Works of Nonfiction of the Decade" by Literary Hub in December 2019.

Reading lists 
The book has been recommended by several publications and placed in reading lists, including the "Indie Next Lists" produced by IndieBound. It was also included in "The Scientist’s Summer Reading List" produced by Science Magazine in June 2020.

Release details

Sales 
The book was said to be one of Britain's most highly anticipated books of 2019 by The Sunday Times in December 2018. It went on to become a Sunday Times Bestseller, making number two on the list the week after its release, making number three the following two weeks, and made number four the following week. The book reappeared on the list for the week of 1 September 2019 as number eight in general hardbacks. The book made the monthly New York Times Best Seller list for science books at number five for July 2019. The book also made 25 October 2020 paperback nonfiction bestsellers list by The Los Angeles Times.

English edition

Translations 
The book has been translated into Catalan, Dutch, French, German, Greek, Italian, Norwegian, Polish, Spanish, and Swedish. Among other honours, LiFO Magazine named the Greek translation "Book of the Week", for the week of 20 May 2020, as well as the fifth best translated book of the year 2020. The Polish translation was also named one of the "10 best books of 2020" by Gazeta Wyborcza.

See also 

 Entangled Life

References

Further reading

External links 
 
 UK publisher's website
 Worldwide publisher's website
 Audiobook publisher's website

2019 non-fiction books
W. W. Norton & Company books
Hamish Hamilton books
Popular science books